The Ministry of Transport is a government ministry of Gabon, headquartered in the Immeuble Interministériel (Interministerial Building) in Libreville. As of 2015 the current minister is Paulette Megue M'Owono.

The Bureau d'Enquêtes Incidents et Accidents d'Aviation (BEIAA), Gabon's civil aviation accident agency, is an agency of the ministry. It was created by Decree No. 00804 of 19 October 2009.

See also
 Agence Nationale de l'Aviation Civil

References

External links
  Ministry of Transport
  "Gabon : le Ministère des Transports paralysé par une grève illimitée" (Archive). Gabon Libre. Friday 12 July 2013.

Gabon
Government of Gabon
GAbon
Transport organizations based in Gabon